The first USS Chauncey was a , also referred to as a "Torpedo-boat destroyer", in the United States Navy named for Commodore Isaac Chauncey. She was launched in 1901 and sunk in 1917.

Construction and design
Chauncey was laid down at Neafie and Levy Ship and Engine Building Company of Philadelphia, Pennsylvania on 2 December 1899 as a member of the Bainbridge class, and was launched on 26 October 1901.

As the Bainbridge class was intended to be more seaworthy than the US Navy's torpedo boats, the ship had a raised forecastle instead of the "turtleback" forecastle common in European designs. Four funnels were fitted. Armament consisted of two /50 caliber guns, five 6-pounder guns and two  torpedo tubes.

Chauncey was placed in reduced commission on 20 November 1902, then placed in reserve on 2 December 1902 and received full commission on 21 February 1903. Lieutenant Stanford Elwood Moses was placed in command and Chauncey reported to the Atlantic Fleet.

Pre-World War I
Chauncey served with the Coast Squadron until 20 September 1903, when she was transferred to the Asiatic Fleet and left Key West for the Orient on 18 December. After sailing by way of the Suez Canal, she arrived at Cavite to join the force representing US interest in the Far East as it cruised in the Philippines during winters and off China during summers. Aside from the period of 3 December 1905 – 12 January 1907, when she was in reserve at Cavite, Chauncey continued this service until the entrance of America into World War I.

Sinking
The destroyer sailed from Cavite on 1 August 1917 for convoy escort duty in the eastern Atlantic, based at St. Nazaire, France. Seventy survivors were picked up by Rose, and carried to port.

Chauncey in literature
The novel Delilah was written by a survivor of Chauncey, Marcus Goodrich, and is a fictional account based on his experience serving aboard Chauncey as an enlisted man.

Noteworthy commanding officers
 Ensign Joseph Rollie Defrees (26 September 1905 – 3 December 1905) (Later Rear Admiral)
 Lieutenant Frank Jack Fletcher (18 April 1912 – 21 December 1912) (Later Admiral) - Fletcher-class destroyer named for his uncle, Medal of Honor recipient Admiral Frank F. Fletcher.

Notes

Citations

Bibliography

Books

Online sources

External links

Bainbridge-class destroyers
World War I destroyers of the United States
Ships built by Neafie and Levy
Ships sunk in collisions
World War I shipwrecks in the Atlantic Ocean
1901 ships
Maritime incidents in 1917